Wisdom Thomas Siziba (26 October 1980 – 15 April 2009) was a Zimbabwean cricketer who played for Matabeleland. Siziba played 29 matches as a wicket-keeper batsman for Matabeleland between 2000 and 2005 before leaving for South Africa as the cricketing infrastructure in Zimbabwe began to fall apart.

Born in Bulawayo, Siziba suffered from epilepsy. He died from heart failure while living in South Africa, aged 28.

References

External links
Cricinfo profile
CricketArchive page

1980 births
2009 deaths
Matabeleland cricketers
Cricketers from Bulawayo
CFX Academy cricketers